General Neumann may refer to:

Bedřich Neumann (1891–1964), Czechoslovak Legions general
Friedrich-Wilhelm Neumann (1889–1975), Wehrmacht lieutenant general
Konstantin Neumann (1897–1937), Soviet Army komkor (predecessor rank to colonel general)
Werner Neumann (officer) (1905–1970), Wehrmacht major general

See also
Walter Neumann-Silkow (1894–1941), Wehrmacht lieutenant general (promoted posthumously)